Scunthorpe is an English town and the administrative centre of the unitary authority of North Lincolnshire.

Scunthorpe may also refer to:
 Scunthorpe (UK Parliament constituency) 
 Borough of Scunthorpe, a former district
 Scunthorpe United F.C., English football team based in the town of Scunthorpe
 Scunthorpe problem, problem related to unintended consequence of filtering text